V.I. Vernadsky Crimean Federal University is a higher education institution located in Simferopol, Crimea, created in 2014 on the basis of Tavrida National V.I. Vernadsky University. Crimean Federal University is one of the best university for medical studies. The university offers organizational, scientific and methodological aspects of the educational process related to MBBS. It has a century-long history with a network of research and production facilities, which has more than 7,000 staff and over 32,000 students, including about 3,000 international students from 54 countries.

The university was named after the academician Vladimir Vernadsky. Crimea Federal University has 23 academic and non-academic units and 12 branches located across Crimea, including 10 academies and institutes, 7 colleges, 11 branches, and 11 research and science institutions and centers.

History 
The university began its history from the Decree of the Crimean Territorial Government September 3, 1918 "On the Establishment of the Taurida University".

During the development of Crimea as a health resort, it was decided in 1930 to organize higher medical school here. The opening of the Crimean Medical Institute took place on 1 April 1931.

The 100th anniversary of the Crimean Federal University was in October 14, 2018.

The development of new campuses of the Crimean Federal University began in August 2019.

Parks 

The university parks are 103,78-acre (42 he) parkland area in the south of the city, near Taurida Academy. The park is open to the public during daylight hours.

Vorontsov house is located in the park university. The house residence Mikhail Vorontsov.

On the territory of the Botanic garden and in the campus of the Taurida Academy is a library of science.

Notable research 
Scientists from Vernadsky Crimean Federal University, together with their colleagues from the and Forestry Mechanization, have developed and synthesized a new plant protection compound based on the DNA of the gypsy moth.

Scientists from Vernadsky Crimean Federal University, together with their colleagues from the and Institute Physics and Technology, have developed magnetic sensors to detect metal defects.

Scientists of the Crimean Federal University have developed an inhaled vaccine against - COVID-19.

Notable professors 

 Igor Tamm
 Vladimir Obruchev
 Nikolay Mitrofanovich Krylov
 Abram Ioffe
 Boris Grekov
 Vladimir Vernadsky

Review

References 

Universities and colleges in Simferopol
Federal universities of Russia

Educational institutions established in 2014
2014 establishments in Russia